The Kriči or Kriçi() were, a medieval Albanian tribe, which inhabited the region around the Tara river, roughly corresponding to the modern region of Mojkovac. Kriči (and similar names) has been periodically mentioned in historical sources, geographical and ethnological literature. They, as other pre-Slavic tribes in the region, eventually assimilated into the Serb ethnos. Some toponyms in Montenegro and surnames are derived from the name of this tribe.

Etymology
Vladimir Ćorović (1885–1941) and Tatomir Vukanović (1907–1997) argued that the name derived from Thracian krisio, or Illyrian krüsi, which would according to the Albanian term kryeziu mean "dark, dark-haired or swarthy people" ..Professor Momčilo Poleksić from Pljevlja, hailing from Drobnjak, notes in an oral statement the name may have been a transformation from grčki ("Greek") to krički.  In Serbo-Croatian, kričiti and kriknuti means "shouting"; kričak means a "person who shouts".

History

They are considered to have been recent immigrants of Albanian origin, with authors like Hrabak and Imami viewing them as having been part of the Albanian pastoral migrant groups, which included communities like the Mataruge, Žurovići and Burmazi, that in the 12th and 13th centuries immigrated across the Zeta all the way to the Neretva. It is established that there were "Arbanassi (Albanian) groups" in the  Tara region in 1278. During the 14th centuries, the Albanian katun (a medieval self-governing community) had been largely assimilated by numerous Vlach communities, who were themselves in a process of Slavcization.

The name Kričan is mentioned as a region in the 1260 charter of Stefan Uroš I regarding the borders of the village of Prošćenje (near Mojkovac); Kričan borders the village to the north. The toponym may have given its name to the people, or vice versa. In ca. 1300 was mentioned personal name Kričan.

They several times violently fought with Drobnjaci tribe (including Kriči voivode Kalok) and were moved over Tara river. Then inhabited lands from Sutjeska to Kolašin. Their center was in Pljevlja (with local toponym Kričak between it and Bijelo Polje).
S. Tomić in his anthropological work Drobnjak (1902), mentioned the Španje and Kričove as the old population of Drobnjak.

Kotor documents mention Lore Kričko (Lore de Criçco) in 1326, and Kriče Vitomirov (Crice Vitomiri) in 1327. Dubrovnik archive mention Dobrija and Đurađ Nenadić from Krički (de Crizche) in 1453. In Ottoman defter from 1477 was recorded nahija Kričak, with 5 džemat (katuns), one by knez Jarosav, another on name Nikola son of Kričko, as well nahija Mataruge with 3 katuns. In 1492, in Poljica in Dalmatia was recorded David Kričković. In 1528, Nikola Grubanović Kričak from village Kruševica transcribed a Church book. In the memorial of Hilandar from 16h or 17th century is mentioned Filip Kričak and several his Kričak relatives. In 1694 in Drniš is mentioned priest Radojica Kričak, while 1762 priest Maksim Kričković.

Their tribal name remained in the anthroponomy (surname Kričković), and toponymy of lands where lived; Kričak and Kričačko polje in Sinjajevina, Kričina near Bribir, village Kričke near Drniš, another two homonymous villages near Pakrac, and Kričići near Jajce.

Legacy
Various folk traditions have been preserved and recorded on the Kriči and their history.

According to oral tradition, Kriči inhabited Jezera and Šaranci, and good part of Sinjajevina.
According to Mula Joksimović of Bijelo Polje, as recorded by Petar Rudić,  a folk tradition transmitted in the Joksimović brotherhood held that the Kriči descended from the Illyrians, "but today there are no more of their direct descendants".
Another belief recorded by P. Rudić, likely influenced by literature, was that the Kriči may have been descendants of Saxons (Sasi) that worked in the mines of Brskovo and around Pljevlja.
A. Luburić (1891–1944), describes a folk tradition of the Drobnjaci, in which they are recounted as being part of the Mataruge tribe, who after the first onrush of Slavs in Herzegovina, and death of Mataruge king Sumor in the end of the 7th or beginning of the 8th century, retreated to the areas around the Tara. Here, the Serbs gave the tribe the name Kriči, because their speech sounded like "shouting" (kričanje). The tribe accepted the name, and it spread in the middle Potarje.
According to M. Peruničić and  P. Čabarkapa (born ca. 1880) and confirmed by a similar tradition by B. Ćorović (born ca. 1894) and younger S. Bojović of Pljevlja, the Kriči were once a numerous tribe, living in the region of Kričak (southeast of Kosanica, while the Mataruge had only comprised one of its many brotherhood  This tradition is "supported" by the fact that the region of Mataruge is smaller and taken as a peripheral part of the larger, in widest sense, Kričak region. Conversely, folk tradition in Polimlje and Potarje  hold the Mataruge as unrelated to the Kriči.
The locals of the Kričak region call the village of Kričak, Krčak, because it allegedly was the place of a "Greek warrior settlement".

Annotations

{{Cnote2|a|Sometimes referred to as Kričkovi, Kričovi, Kričkovići or Kričani.

See also
Vlachs in medieval Serbia
Vlachs in medieval Bosnia and Herzegovina
Tribes of Montenegro

References

Sources

Further reading 
 

Medieval Montenegro
Tribes of Montenegro